Tomorrow Artsakh, also known as Artsakh of Tomorrow, is an Armenian political party in Artsakh.

History
The Tomorrow Artsakh party was established in 2018. Its founder and current party leader is Tigran Petrosyan. The party currently has no parliamentary representation within the National Assembly and acts as an extra-parliamentary force. Following the 2020 Nagorno-Karabakh war, the party released a statement advising that the party would not cooperate with any other political forces in Artsakh until internal socio-economic and political issues are resolved.

Electoral record
Prior to the 2020 Artsakhian general election, the party announced its intentions to join the New Artsakh Alliance. The alliance pledged to support Masis Mayilyan for the presidential nomination. Following the election, the alliance gained just 4.60% of the votes after the first round of voting. As such, the alliance failed to gain any seats in the National Assembly.

Ideology
The party supports fighting corruption and economic monopolies, strengthening the rule of law in Artsakh, and encouraging population growth.

See also

 List of political parties in Artsakh
 Politics of Artsakh

References

External links	
 Tomorrow Artsakh on Facebook

Political parties in the Republic of Artsakh
Political parties established in 2018